Gérard Lifondja (born 2 March 1989) is a Belgian-Congolese former footballer.

Career 
Lifondja began his career in the youth side for Royal Racing Club Etterbeek. He signed than in summer 2002 with RWD Molenbeek, before in January 2005 joined to the youth Academy of RSC Anderlecht. After two years in the youth side with Anderlecht in July 2007 he was scouted by Dutch side RKC Waalwijk. He played during his three years 19 games in the Eredivisie for Waalwijk.

He joined in summer 2010 to Cyprus side Digenis Akritas Morphou. On 5 July 2011 announced his return to Belgium and signed for KRC Mechelen.

International 
Lifondja was member of the U-23 Squad of the Democratic Republic of the Congo under-23 national football team during the Olympic Games 2008 Qualification.

Notes

External links
 Official MySpace
 

1989 births
Living people
Belgian footballers
Association football midfielders
RKC Waalwijk players
Eredivisie players
Belgian expatriate footballers
Citizens of the Democratic Republic of the Congo through descent
Democratic Republic of the Congo footballers
Expatriate footballers in Cyprus
R.S.C. Anderlecht players
Belgian people of Democratic Republic of the Congo descent
Digenis Akritas Morphou FC players
Belgian expatriate sportspeople in the Netherlands
K.R.C. Mechelen players
Expatriate footballers in the Netherlands
R.W.D. Molenbeek players
Democratic Republic of the Congo international footballers
Cypriot Second Division players